St Nicholas' Almshouses is a historic building on King Street, Bristol, England.

It was built in 1652 to 1656, extended in the 19th century and restored 1961 by Donald Insall. The foundations of a bastion of the City Wall were revealed during restoration. It has been designated by English Heritage as a grade II* listed building.

The almshouse was one of the first buildings in King Street, a new development then outside the city wall and beside the "Back Street Gate".

The building was damaged during the Bristol Blitz and now presents only a facade to the street. It no longer serves the homeless as it did in previous centuries. It is now student accommodation.

See also
 Grade II* listed buildings in Bristol
 List of British almshouses

References

Grade II* listed buildings in Bristol
Buildings and structures completed in 1656
Almshouses in Bristol
Houses in Bristol
Grade II* listed almshouses
17th century in Bristol